Dinner Is Served is a 1936 German comedy film directed by Hans H. Zerlett and starring Herbert Hübner, Gertrud de Lalsky, and Hertha Guthmar. The film is a comedy set around the British aristocracy.

The film's sets were designed by the art director Karl Machus.

Cast

References

Bibliography

External links 
 

1936 films
Films of Nazi Germany
German comedy films
1936 comedy films
1930s German-language films
Films directed by Hans H. Zerlett
Films set in England
Films set in London
German black-and-white films
1930s German films